Sitaram Surajmal Jajoo (29 May 1915 – 25 November 1983) was an Indian politician from the state of the Madhya Pradesh. Did Ll.B. from Allahabad University c 1939. Freedom Fighter 1942. Member Constituent Assembly of India 1950. Member of provisional Parliament (1947-1952).
He represented Neemuch Vidhan Sabha constituency in Madhya Bharat (1952-1956). Minister to the Government of Madhya Bharat (1952-1956) & Madhya Pradesh (1956-1962). Minister to Government of Madhya Pradesh 1956. Legislative Assembly by winning General election of 1952 & 1957. Chairman Madhya Pradesh State Road Transport Corporation (1972-1977).

References 

http://www.parliamentofindia.nic.in/ls/debates/members.htm#AJMER-MERWARA
https://en.wikipedia.org/wiki/Constituent_Assembly_of_India

People from Madhya Pradesh
Madhya Pradesh MLAs 1957–1962
People from Neemuch
Indian National Congress politicians
1915 births
1983 deaths
Indian National Congress politicians from Madhya Pradesh